Boston Harbor is a natural harbor and estuary of Massachusetts Bay,  and is located adjacent to the city of Boston, Massachusetts. It is home to the Port of Boston, a major shipping facility in the Northeastern United States.

History

Since its discovery to Europeans by John Smith in 1614, Boston Harbor has been an important port in American history. Early on, it was recognized by  Europeans as one of the finest natural harbors in the world due to its depth and natural defense from the Atlantic as a result of the many islands that dot the harbor. It was also favored due to its access to the Charles River, Neponset River and Mystic River which made travel from the harbor deeper into Massachusetts far easier. It was the site of the Boston Tea Party, as well as almost continuous building of wharves, piers, and new filled land into the harbor until the 19th century. By 1660, almost all imports came to the greater Boston area and the New England coast through the waters of Boston Harbor. A rapid influx of people transformed Boston into an exploding city.

Pollution and cleanup efforts
The health of the harbor quickly deteriorated as the population of Boston increased. As early as the late 19th century Boston citizens were advised not to swim in any portion of the Harbor. In the 19th century, two of the first steam sewage stations were built (one in East Boston and one later on Deer Island). With these mandates, the harbor was seeing small improvements, but raw sewage was still continuously pumped into the harbor. In 1919, the Metropolitan District Commission was created to oversee and regulate the quality of harbor water. However, not much improvement was seen and general public awareness of the poor quality of water was very low. In 1972, the Clean Water Act was passed in order to help promote increased national water quality.

Boston did not receive a Clean Water Act waiver from the Environmental Protection Agency, leaving Boston with little incentive to increase water quality of the harbor. Since the mid-1970s organizations within the Boston community have battled for a cleaner Boston Harbor. More recently, the harbor was the site of the $4.5 billion Boston Harbor Project. Failures at the Nut Island sewage treatment plant in Quincy and the companion Deer Island plant adjacent to Winthrop had far-reaching environmental and political effects. Fecal coliform bacteria levels forced frequent swimming prohibitions along the harbor beaches and the Charles River for many years. The city of Quincy sued the Metropolitan District Commission (MDC) and the separate Boston Water and Sewer Commission in 1982, charging that unchecked systemic pollution of the city's waterfront contributed to the problem. That suit was followed by one by Conservation Law Foundation and finally by the United States government, resulting in the landmark court-ordered cleanup of Boston Harbor.

The lawsuits forced then-Massachusetts Governor Michael Dukakis to propose separating the water and sewer treatment divisions from the MDC, resulting in the creation of the Massachusetts Water Resources Authority in 1985. The slow progress of the cleanup became a key theme of the 1988 U.S. presidential election as George H. W. Bush defeated Dukakis partly through campaign speeches casting doubt on the governor's environmental record, which Dukakis himself had claimed was better than that of Bush. The court-ordered cleanup continued throughout the next two decades and is still ongoing.

Before the clean-up projects, the water was so polluted that The Standells released a song in 1965 called "Dirty Water" which referred to the sorry state of the Charles River. Neal Stephenson, who attended Boston University from 1977 to 1981, based his second novel, Zodiac, around pollution of the harbor.

Since the writing of the song, the water quality in both the Harbor and the Charles River has significantly improved, and the projects have dramatically transformed Boston Harbor from one of the filthiest in the nation to one of the cleanest. Today, Boston Harbor is safe for fishing and for swimming nearly every day, though there are still beach closings after even small rainstorms, caused by bacteria-laden storm water and the occasional combined sewer overflow.

In 2022, pieces of plastic transmission line used in rock explosives, (known as explosive shock tubing) began washing up on coastal shores of Cape Cod and Rhode Island. This led to an investigation that was conducted by the U.S. Army Corps of Engineers, it was suspected to have been related to a concluded Boston Harbor dredging project.  The outcome was to seek to find methods to prevent future environmental impacts from reoccurring.

Geography

Boston Harbor is a large harbor which constitutes the western extremity of Massachusetts Bay. The harbor is sheltered from Massachusetts Bay and the open Atlantic Ocean by a combination of the Winthrop Peninsula and Deer Island to the north, the hooked Nantasket Peninsula and Point Allerton to the south, and the harbor islands in the middle. The harbor is often described as being split into an inner harbor and an outer harbor.

Inner harbor
The inner harbor was historically the main port of Boston and is still the site of most of its port facilities as well as the Boston waterfront, which has been redeveloped for residential and recreational uses. The inner harbor extends from the mouths of the Charles River and the Mystic River, both of which empty into the harbor, to Logan International Airport and Castle Island, the latter now connected by land in 1928 to Boston, where the inner harbor meets the outer harbor.

Outer harbor
The outer harbor stretches to the south and east of the inner harbor. To its landward side, and moving in a counterclockwise direction, the harbor is made up of the three small bays of  Dorchester Bay, Quincy Bay and Hingham Bay. To seaward, the two deep water anchorages of President Roads and Nantasket Roads are separated by Long Island. The outer harbor is fed by several rivers, including the Neponset River, the Weymouth Fore River, the Weymouth Back River and the Weir River.

Dredged deepwater channels stretch from President Roads to the inner harbor, and from Nantasket Roads to the Weymouth Fore River and Hingham Bay via Hull Gut and West Gut. Some commercial port facilities are located in the Fore River area, an area which has a history of shipbuilding including the notable Fore River Shipyard.

Land fill
In the 1830s, members of the maritime community observed physical decay in the harbor. Islands in the outer harbor were visibly deteriorating and erosion was causing weathered materials and sediment to move from where it was protecting the harbor to where it would do the most harm. Recent shoaling experiences and comparisons with old charts caused observers to insist that the inner harbor was also filling and created widespread anxiety about the destruction of the Boston Harbor. Although the scientific understanding of hydraulics was still in its infancy and there were high degrees of uncertainty regarding the meeting of land and water, scientists and engineers began to describe the Boston Harbor as a series of channels created and maintained by the scouring force of water moving in and out of the harbor, river systems, and tidal reservoirs. This interpretation came to be known as the theory of Tidal scour. This understanding of the harbor as a dynamic landscape assuaged concerns some had over the negative impacts of land fill operations of land and real estate developers.

As the 19th century progressed, the acceleration of urban growth dramatically increased the need for more land. Generally, other states drew the line of private property at high tide. However, extending shore lines into bordering bodies of water was not unique to Boston. Chicago built into Lake Michigan, New York extended itself into the Hudson and East rivers, and San Francisco reclaimed sections of its bay. The Boston Harbor's unique geography inspired the law that made land reclamation such a widespread activity in Boston. By the end of the nineteenth century, the city had created more land in two generations than it had in the previous two centuries.

Harbor Islands

Boston Harbor contains a considerable number of islands, 34 of which have been part of the Boston Harbor Islands National Recreation Area since its establishment in 1996. The following islands exist within the harbor, or just outside it in Massachusetts Bay:

 Bumpkin Island
 Button Island
 Calf Island
 Castle Island
 Deer Island
 Gallops Island
 Georges Island
 Grape Island
 Great Brewster Island
 Green Island
 Hangman Island
 Langlee Island
 Little Brewster Island
 Little Calf Island
 Long Island
 Lovells Island
 Middle Brewster Island
 Moon Island
 Nixes Mate
 Outer Brewster Island
 Peddocks Island
 Raccoon Island
 Ragged Island
 Rainsford Island
 Sarah Island
 Shag Rocks
 Sheep Island
 Slate Island
 Snake Island
 Spectacle Island
 Spinnaker Island
 The Graves
 Thompson Island

Two former islands, Castle Island and Deer Island, still exist in a recognizable form. Castle Island was joined to the mainland by land reclamation, while Deer Island ceased to be an island when the channel which formerly separated it from the mainland was filled in by the New England Hurricane of 1938.

Nut Island is a small former island in Boston Harbor that was joined by landfill to the Houghs Neck peninsula in northeastern Quincy by the 1940s so it could be used as the site of a sewage treatment facility.

Two other former islands, Apple Island and Governors Island, have been subsumed into land reclamation for Logan International Airport.

The Harbor Islands have made up Boston's least populated electoral area, Ward 1, Precinct 15, since 1990, though the polling place is on the mainland at Columbia Point. Since 1920, Boston must pass legislation to redistrict. As of 2018, there were two active voters, staff at the Thompson Island Outward Bound Educational Center. There were previously registered voters at a recovery center and a homeless shelter on Long Island, but few voted and they have closed.

Aquaculture
In 1996, the Boston Globe reported that Mayor Thomas Menino and MIT engineer Clifford Goudey were planning a program to use the great tanks on Moon Island as a fish farm or a temporary home for tuna or lobster in an attempt to implement a recirculating aquaculture system in Boston Harbor.  The prices of both these fish types vary by season.  The plan was to collect and store fish in the tanks and sell the fish at higher prices when they were out of season. Nothing has come of this plan to date.

Lights and other aids to navigation
 Boston Light
 Deer Island Light
 Egg Rock Light
 Long Island Head Light
 Lovells Island Range Lights
 Nixes Mate
 Spectacle Island Range Lights
 The Graves Light

Images

See also
 Boston Harbor Islands National Recreation Area
 Massachusetts Port Authority
 Boston Harborwalk

References

External links

 Save the Harbor / Save the Bay
The Boston Harbor Association
 NOAA Soundings Map of Boston Harbor
 Flickr.com, Photos, January 2009.
 Flickr.com, Photos, November 2009.
 Flickr.com, Photos, February 2010.
 Dutton, E.P. Chart of Boston Harbor and Massachusetts Bay with Map of Adjacent Country.  Published 1867. A good map of a proposed build-out of infrastructure into the Boston Harbor.
 Judge A. David Mazzone chambers papers on the Boston Harbor Cleanup Case, 1985–2005, University Archives and Special Collections, Joseph P. Healey Library, University of Massachusetts Boston

 
Geography of Boston
Boston
Estuaries of Massachusetts
Bodies of water of Norfolk County, Massachusetts
Bodies of water of Plymouth County, Massachusetts
Bodies of water of Suffolk County, Massachusetts